Edward Jewitt Robinson was a 19th-century Protestant missionary to British India. He is best known as one of the earliest translators of the Tirukkural into English.

Biography 
Edward Jewitt Robinson published a collection of ancient Tamil texts, including the Tirukkural, translated into English in 1873. The work was titled Tamil Wisdom. Facilitating the evangelical works of the missionaries like Constanzo Beschi, Ziegenbalg, and Percival, Robinson published an enlarged version of the work under the title Tales and Poems of South India in 1885. In the preface of his second work, he acknowledged the earlier translations by F. W. Ellis, W. H. Drew, Karl Graul and Charles E. Gover.

Robinson, like other earlier missionaries, translated only the first (Aram) and second books (Porul) of the Kural text, translating 108 chapters in verse. He did not translate the third book (Inbam). His English contemporaries greatly praised his verse translation, although native scholars of later years, such as T. P. Meenakshisundaram, had some reservations about its fidelity to the original.

G. U. Pope, in his preface to The Sacred Kurral, felicitated Robinson thus:

See also

 Tirukkural translations
 Tirukkural translations into English
 List of translators into English

References

Protestant missionaries in India
Tamil scholars of non-Tamil background
Tamil–English translators
Translators of the Tirukkural into English
Tirukkural translators
Missionary linguists